Nachyn Olzeevich Mongush (born 28 January 2000) is a Russian freestyle wrestler who currently competes at 57 kilograms and represents Tuva in the national circuit. Mongush was a silver medalist at the 2021 European Continental Championships and the 2021 Russian National Championships.

Major results

References

External links 
 

Living people
2000 births
Place of birth missing (living people)
Russian male sport wrestlers
European Wrestling Championships medalists
21st-century Russian people